Libardo Niño Corredor (born 26 September 1968) is a male road racing cyclist from Colombia. He competed for his native country at the 1992 Summer Olympics, finishing in 76th place in the individual road race. Colombia competed with three cyclists in this event; the other ones being José Robles (49th) and Héctor Palacio (52nd).

Major results

1993
Vuelta a Colombia
1st Prologue & Stages 8 & 14
1994
3rd Overall Clásico RCN
1st Stages 4, 5 & 6
1995
5th Overall Vuelta a Colombia
1st Stage 4
1st Stage 7 Clásico RCN
1997
9th Overall Vuelta a Colombia
1998
1st Stage 9 Ruta Mexico
3rd Overall Vuelta a Colombia
2001
1st Stage 10 Vuelta a Colombia
2002 
3rd Overall Vuelta a Colombia
2003
1st  Overall Vuelta a Colombia
1st  Points classification
1st Stage 5
1st Stage 9 Vuelta a Guatemala
2004
1st  Overall Vuelta a Colombia
1st  Points classification
1st Prologue & Stage 4
 2nd Time trial, National Road Championships
2005
1st  Overall Vuelta a Colombia
1st  Points classification
1st Stage 5
1st  Overall Clásico RCN
1st Stage 3
2006
 1st  Time trial, National Road Championships
2nd Overall Vuelta a El Salvador
1st Mountains classification
1st Stages 4 & 7
2nd Overall Clásico RCN
1st Mountains classification
1st Stage 6
4th Time trial, Central American and Caribbean Games
5th Time trial, Pan American Road and Track Championships
2007
1st  Time trial, Pan American Road and Track Championships
1st  Overall Clásico RCN
3rd Overall Doble Copacabana Grand Prix Fides
1st Stage 5b
6th Overall Vuelta a Colombia
8th Overall Doble Sucre Potosí GP Cemento Fancesa
2009
1st  Overall Vuelta Ciclista Chiapas
1st Stage 1 (ITT)
4th Overall Vuelta a Bolivia
2010
2nd Overall Doble Sucre Potosí GP Cemento Fancesa
4th Overall Vuelta al Ecuador
2011
2nd Overall Tour de Langkawi
2nd Overall International Presidency Tour
1st Stage 1

References

1968 births
Living people
Colombian male cyclists
Colombian sportspeople in doping cases
Doping cases in cycling
Cyclists at the 1992 Summer Olympics
Olympic cyclists of Colombia
Vuelta a Colombia stage winners
Sportspeople from Nariño Department
Pan American Games competitors for Colombia
Competitors at the 2006 Central American and Caribbean Games
20th-century Colombian people
21st-century Colombian people